This is a list of airlines currently operating in Honduras.

See also
 List of airlines
 List of defunct airlines of Honduras

References

Honduras
Airlines
Airlines
Honduras